John Paul Krempel (October 19, 1861 – September 14, 1933) was a German-born American architect. He designed private residences and commercial buildings in Los Angeles, including the old Los Angeles Times building. Some houses he designed are Historic Cultural Los Angeles City Landmarks.

Early life
John Paul Krempel was born on October 19, 1861, in Germany. He had a brother and three sisters. He was trained as an engineer in Berlin and emigrated to the United States at 25.

Career
Krempel became an architect in Los Angeles. In 1898, he designed The Bivouac for Harrison Gray Otis in the Mission Revival architectural style at 2401 Wilshire Boulevard near MacArthur Park; it was demolished in 1954. Other private residences he designed were the August Winstell House at 1147 South Alvarado Street in the Tudor Revival architectural style in 1907, or the G. Wrenner House at 2080 West Adams Boulevard and the August Rothenpiller House in San Pedro in 1908. Another house he designed in the Victorian Craftsman architectural style, located at 1326 South Manhattan Place, is a Historic Cultural Los Angeles City Landmark. He designed the old building of The Los Angeles Times on Broadway in the Richardsonian Romanesque style. He also designed the Engine Co. No. 28 firehouse.

With architect Walter E. Erkes, Krempel designed the Agricultural Chemical Works Warehouse on the corner of Macy Street and Mission Road in 1908, the German Hospital in Boyle Heights, Los Angeles., and a three-story building at South Spring Street and 3rd Avenue in 1911. They also designed the Turnverein Germania Club on the corner of West Washington Boulevard and Toberman Street in Los Angeles in 1925–1926. It was renamed the Los Angeles Turner Club in 1943, and demolished in 1976. Another building they designed, the Eastside Brewing Company Brewery Building at 2100 North Main Street, is a Historic Cultural Los Angeles City Landmark. Additionally, they designed buildings outside Los Angeles, like the American Beet Sugar Company Adobe Housing Building in Oxnard, California in 1918, or the Bank of Italy National Trust and Savings Association Building at Garfield Street and East Main Street in Alhambra, California in 1928.

Personal life and death
Krempel married Emelie Kuhrts, the daughter of Jacob Kuhrts. They resided at 336 South Rodeo Drive in Beverly Hill, California. He was "a Scottish Rite Mason, a member of the Los Angeles Commandery of the Knights Templar, of the Al Malaikah Temple of the Shrine, of Elks' Lodge No. 99".

Krempel died on September 14, 1933, at the Lincoln Hospital in Los Angeles, and he was buried at the Inglewood Park Cemetery.

References

1861 births
1933 deaths
German emigrants to the United States
Architects from Los Angeles
People from Beverly Hills, California
19th-century German architects
20th-century German architects
19th-century American architects
20th-century American architects
American Freemasons